The H class are a class of diesel locomotives built by Clyde Engineering, Granville for the Victorian Railways in 1968–1969.

History
The H Class were built as T class locomotives with modifications for use at the Melbourne Hump Yard. They were fitted additional equipment for their duties, including extra weight for traction, "manual power control" to allow low speed operation, and an accurate low speed speedometer.

The H class were delivered as T413 to T417, but were reclassified before entering service. The class rarely left Melbourne due to their excessive weight, until being approved to operate on the same lines as the N class in January 1987. All were included in the sale of V/Line Freight to Freight Victoria in May 1999 and passed with the business to Pacific National in August 2004.

Pacific National sold three of the H class to the Ettamogah Rail Hub in 2015. Two of those were on-sold to 707 Operations in 2018. H4 was scrapped in 2020, while H1 had had its long hood cladding removed and was stored in North Dynon between 2020 and April 2022, when it was transferred to the Seymour Railway Heritage Centre as part of a long-term restoration project.

Status table

References

Bo-Bo locomotives
Clyde Engineering locomotives
Pacific National diesel locomotives
Railway locomotives introduced in 1968
H class
Broad gauge locomotives in Australia
Diesel-electric locomotives of Australia